The 2013–14 National Ringette League season for the sport of ringette was the 10th season of the National Ringette League and began on October 5, 2013 and ended on March 9, 2014.

The Ottawa Ice won their first ever title.

Teams 
Three teams did not join this season.
Quebec City Cyclones: East Division
Prairie Fire: West Division
BC Thunder: West Division

Regular Seasons 
Teams played in following formats.
 East
Plays 2 to 3 games against same sub-division teams and 2 games to same sub-division teams.
Plays 0 or 2 games against each or both of West division teams.
West
Play 11 games against same division team.
Play 0 or 2 against East division teams.

Standings 
x indicates clinches the playoff
y indicates clinches the Championship (Elite Eight)

East Conference

West Conference

Allstar game 
This was the second Allstar game in the League.
The team name in the parenthesis is the team player belongs to at that time.

Playoffs 

Ottawa, Richmond hill, Gloucester and Waterloo win the series in the knockout stage and go to the elite eight.
In the Elite eight, Cambridge finished the round robin first place and went to the final. Ottawa and Edmonton went to semifinal.
In the semifinal, Ottawa beat the Edmonton to the final against Cambridge.
Ottawa beat Cambridge 7–4 to win the first ever title.

Award 
MVP: Dailyn Bell (EDM)
Top Goalie: Tori Goble (OTT)

Stats 
Regular season
Player except goalie
Goal
East Jacqueline Gaudet (91, CAM)
West Dailyn Bell (32, EDM)
Assist
East Jennifer Gaudet (91, CAM)
West Emily Webb (32, CGY)
Point
East Jacqueline Gaudet, Jennifer Gaudet  (both are 126, CAM)
West Dailyn Bell (32, EDM)
Goalie
Saving %
East Meghan Pittaway (.919, CAM)
West Bobbi Mattson (.891, CGY)
Goals against average
East Meghan Pittaway (2.80, CAM)
West Bobbi Mattson (3.76, CGY)
Win
East Tori Goble (17, OTT)
West Bobbi Mattson (18, CGY)
Playoffs

References 

National Ringette League
Ringette
Ringette competitions